Teenage Dream is the third studio album by American singer Katy Perry. It was released on August 24, 2010, through Capitol Records. Primarily a pop record, Teenage Dream also contains elements of disco, electronic, rock, funk, house, Hi-NRG, and hip hop, that revolve around young love, partying, self-empowerment, and personal growth. Perry co-wrote the album, and worked with a number of producers such as Dr. Luke, Max Martin, Benny Blanco, Stargate and Greg Wells.

With "California Gurls", "Teenage Dream", "Firework", "E.T.", and "Last Friday Night (T.G.I.F.)", Teenage Dream is the second album in history to have five number-one singles (after Michael Jackson's 1987 album Bad) to top the US Billboard Hot 100, and the first by a woman to achieve this milestone. Its sixth single, "The One That Got Away", peaked at number three on that chart. The album debuted at number one on the US Billboard 200, selling 192,000 copies in its first week. The album was later certified nine times platinum by the Recording Industry Association of America (RIAA) for combined album sales, track sales, on-demand audio and video streams equivalent of nine million album-sale units. The album has gone onto sell 3.1 million copies in the United States, and charted within the Top 40 of the Billboard 200 year-end chart three years in a row. The album also sold 1.3 million copies in the United Kingdom, where it was certified five times platinum by the British Phonographic Industry (BPI).

Upon its release, Teenage Dream received mixed reviews from music critics, who complimented its themes but were divided over its production and Perry's vocals. However, retrospective reviews have praised the album, ranking it on multiple decade-end best albums lists. Billboard named Teenage Dream "one of the defining LPs from a new golden age in mega-pop" and The A.V. Club called the album "pop perfection". The album and its singles earned Perry seven Grammy Award nominations including Album of the Year, Best Pop Vocal Album, and Record of the Year.

It also won International Album of the Year at the Juno Awards of 2011. All six of the aforementioned singles, in addition to two from its 2012 reissue Teenage Dream: The Complete Confection, have sold over two million digital downloads each in the US, setting a record in the digital era for the most multi-Platinum singles from one album, breaking the previous record of Fergie's debut album The Dutchess (2006), which had five multi-Platinum songs. To promote the album, Perry embarked on the California Dreams Tour from 2011 to 2012. By July 2013, Teenage Dream had sold 6 million copies worldwide.

Background 

Prior to recording Teenage Dream, Perry told Rolling Stone she would "definitely keep it pop", in order to not "alienate" her fanbase. Perry began recording the album on October 13, 2009, stating that she had "lots of layers to get through, thankfully Greg Wells is there to do the peeling". Work on the album involved collaborating with numerous artists and producers including Wells. Guy Sigsworth, Dr. Luke, Max Martin, Ryan Tedder, Rivers Cuomo, Kuk Harrell, Greg Kurstin, Benny Blanco, Darkchild, Cathy Dennis, Esther Dean, and Tricky Stewart, who told Rap-Up magazine in December 2009 that the sound of the album would be pop and rock, like One of the Boys, though calling it a "different gear" for himself. As for the visual component, Perry likens it to "going from Shirley Temple, Betty Boop to more of a Betty Paige [sic], pop art-sarcastic-fun-Lichtenstein picture: still bright, but the colors are more saturated, and it's more metallic fuchsia or purple than bubblegum pink."

On March 27, 2010, at 2010 Kids' Choice Awards, Perry told Jose Ordonez that she considered the album "a summer record". She added that her previous teases about the album still fit, saying "it's what I said I wanted earlier". She has also stated that the album is inspired by ABBA and the Cardigans. According to Perry, she gave her producer Dr. Luke a mixtape of songs by the two groups in order to demonstrate how she wanted her next record to sound. Perry described the album as "more groove-driven". She added, "When I went on tour, as much as I love all the in-between songs, I felt I was missing some of the stuff that made people bounce up and down." During a Rolling Stone photo shoot in April 2010, Perry revealed details about what would be the album's lead single, "California Gurls". Allegedly a response to Jay-Z and Alicia Keys's "Empire State of Mind", she stated "everyone has the New York song, but what the fuck? What about LA? What about California?", adding that the song also took its inspiration from Prince. The song features California rapper Snoop Dogg. USA Today gave the song a positive review, calling it "an effervescent toast to summer fun". Perry also claimed that working with producers Max Martin and Dr. Luke was "a wonderful collaborative effort".

For the recording of Teenage Dream, Perry had recorded at a multitude of recording studios such as Playback Recording Studio, Roc the Mic Studios, Conway Recording Studios, Rocket Carousel Studio, Studio at the Palms, Triangle Sound Studios, Silent Sound Studios, The Boom Boom Boom, Henson Recording Studios, Capitol Studios, NightBird Recording Studios, and Eightysevenfourteen Studios.  Recording for the album finished on April 30, 2010. The album cover is a painting by Will Cotton, and was revealed on July 21, 2010. via a live webstream with Cotton, at his Art Studio. On July 23, 2010, the album's official track listing was posted on Perry's official website.

Music and lyrics 
Perry stated about the album "You're getting the sugary sweet but you're also getting the 'Oh my goodness, she had to sit down for a minute and let things off her chest'". The music of Teenage Dream is derived from a wide variety of pop genres, while heavily incorporating different musical styles not heard on her previous releases; disco and electronic are examples. Musically, Teenage Dream is considered to be a departure from Perry's previous album, One of the Boys (2008), which was pop rock and soft rock driven. The album features a very wide range of rock subgenres, which include disco rock, glam metal, indie rock, pop rock, hard rock, electronic rock, and goth rock.

Songs

The album opens with the title track and second single "Teenage Dream", which is written as a throwback record to Perry's teenage years. It is a power pop and electropop song which features a "distinct retro sound", and contains influences of disco, pop rock, and industrial music. The song has been compared to several disco artists, including Madonna and the Cardigans. The second song is "Last Friday Night (T.G.I.F.)", the song recalls a true experience that Perry had while partying in Santa Barbara which included streaking in a park, dancing on tables, and partying at a club. Musically, the song is styled in the genres of disco, indie rock, and Hi-NRG, while also taking influence from dance-pop. The lead single, "California Gurls", continues the "retro sound" carried from "Teenage Dream", and is written as an answer song to "Empire State of Mind" by Jay-Z and Alicia Keys, and pays tribute to the beach lifestyle of California. The song utilizes the genres of disco, funk-pop, and electropop, while bearing influence of new wave music within its composition.

The fourth track is the self-empowerment song "Firework". Written in a disco-rock style which runs over the backing track, consisting of a mix of violins and house music. The song has generated comparisons to artists such as Coldplay and Leona Lewis. According to Perry, the song was inspired by Jack Kerouac's novel On the Road, and she has said on many occasions that it is her favorite song from the album. "Peacock" is a dance-pop song, with an up-tempo house music beat. Lyrically, the track contains a double entendre with suggestive wording. New York magazine writer Willa Paskin observed that Perry did the obvious with the song's hook ("she used a common word for penis and made it mean penis!"). Rob Sheffield from Rolling Stone thought of "Peacock" as a sequel to Gwen Stefani's 2005 single "Hollaback Girl" by noticing the two songs shared a drum hook. The album follows with "Circle the Drain", a disco-rock song where, lyrically, Perry is telling off a self-destructive drug-addicted ex-boyfriend. Its candid lyrics also discuss the strains his addiction put on both of them. In the track's chorus, she sings about how she wants to be his lover, not someone who has to take care of him, such as a maternal figure. She also sings about how he had ultimately lost large opportunities. The song is styled in the genres of disco-rock, and gothic rock tones. The sixth single from Teenage Dream is "The One That Got Away", which is a rock and pop ballad. Perry stated that she wrote the song "about when you promise someone forever, but you end up not being able to follow through. It's a bittersweet story. Hopefully, the listener learns from hearing it and never has to say they had "the one" get away."

The eighth song, "E.T." is a song about "falling in love with a foreigner". A remix of the song features Kanye West. Musically, the track is an electronic and hip hop ballad influenced by drum and bass, rave, and techno. The eleventh track, "Hummingbird Heartbeat", was inspired by Perry's boyfriend at the time, Russell Brand. Musically, it is a 1980s-styled hard rock song that contains a mixture of elements from rock and electronica. Lyrically, the song compares the feeling of being in love to the speed of a hummingbird's heartbeat. The last track is "Not Like the Movies" a power ballad about a love relationship where a woman does not feel in love and still waits for the man of her dreams, or "charming prince", as a Terra reviewer put it. Its melody was compared to Britney Spears' "Everytime" (2003) and Evanescence's "My Immortal" (2003).

Release and artwork 

"Teenage Dream" was released on August 24, 2010, in the United States as a digital download on iTunes, and as a physical release by Capitol Records. Worldwide, the album was released on August 30, 2010 and distributed by EMI. A deluxe version was made available on August 27, 2010 in the US, and consists of two CDs with the twelve original tracks, plus two tracks from 2009 on which Perry had appeared as a featured artist — 3OH!3's "Starstrukk" and Timbaland's "If We Ever Meet Again". The deluxe version also includes remixes of "California Gurls" and "Teenage Dream".

In North America, the album was packaged in several different ways. The explicit version of the album is available in a three-panel (six-sided) digipak, which does not feature Perry's name or the album title on the cover, aside from the Parental Advisory warning label on the lower right-hand corner. This is also how the album is displayed if purchased digitally. The booklet contained inside this version reproduces the album's front artwork, without any labels or text. The explicit version is also offered in a standard jewel case, which has text printed on the booklet and has the smell of cotton candy. The cover with text is mainly used for releases outside of North America, while international deluxe editions are available in the digipak, with a bonus disc included. A limited number of the albums are scented like cotton candy indicated by a sticker on the cover.
Artwork based on the album were also used by Electronic Arts for the limited edition of the expansion pack The Sims 3: Showtime from The Sims game franchise. It was released on March 6, 2012.

The official album cover, which shows Perry lying naked on clouds of cotton candy, was painted on canvas by Will Cotton and released on July 21 via live webstream.  The covers of the first two singles were photographed by Emma Summerton in April 2010, and three other pictures taken by the artist were released to promote the album in July.

Promotion 

On June 14, 2010, a beach themed Teenage Dream listening party took place in New York, a number of tracks were played, including: "Teenage Dream", "Firework", "Last Friday Night", "Circle The Drain", "Pearl", "The One That Got Away", "Peacock", and "Not Like the Movies". Before the release of the album, three promotional singles were released exclusively on Apple's iTunes Store as a countdown to Teenage Dream. "Not Like the Movies", was released digitally on August 3, 2010, and debuted at number 53 on the Billboard Hot 100. "Circle the Drain" was released digitally on August 10, 2010 as the second promotional single, and entered the Billboard Hot 100 at number 58. "E.T.", the third, was released the following week on August 17, 2010, and charted at number 42 on the Billboard Hot 100. "Peacock" reached number 64 in Canada, number 52 in the Czech Republic, and number 1 on the US Hot Dance Club Songs chart. It has also sold over 500,000 copies in the US and certified Gold on July 9, 2012. A dance remix of it was released on March 26, 2012.

Promotion for the album began with a live performance of the album's lead single, "California Gurls" on May 20, 2010, at the CW networks' annual "upfronts" presentation in New York. Perry alongside Snoop Dogg performed "California Gurls" at the MTV Movie Awards in June 2010. She also promoted the song that same month on Germany's Next Topmodel 2010 and Le Grand Journal. The Candifornia theme from the "California Gurls" video was used in the song's performance at the MuchMusic Video Awards 2010 and on The Graham Norton Show. On September 5, 2010, Perry performed "Teenage Dream", "Last Friday Night (T.G.I.F.)", "Firework" and "Not Like the Movies" in the show's launch of the Teenage Dream in Berlin.
Perry performed "Teenage Dream" live for the first time in July 2010 in MTV World Stage Live in Malaysia, as well as opening the 2010 Teen Choice Awards with a rendition of it. In August, Perry performed "California Gurls" and "Peacock" on The Morning Show and The Today Show. That same month, "Firework" was performed live for the first time on the Late Show with David Letterman.

While promoting the album, Perry expressed she wanted her upcoming tour to be very visual. On her Twitter account, she stated, "I hope that it's going to engage all of your senses: sight, sound, smell, taste, touch". The California Dreams Tour was officially announced in October 2010 by various media outlets including Perry's official website, in conjunction with the release of her third single, "Firework". In 2011, Perry announced her North American leg during a live chat on social network Facebook. She then responded the tour will be very "super girl power" as vocalists Robyn, Yelle and Marina and the Diamonds will open her shows during the various legs. Perry further stated she will actively participate with fans during the tour on various social networks including Facebook and Twitter. The tour beginning February 20, 2011 on Lisbon, Portugal and the end January 22, 2012 on Pasay, Philippines, the tour visited Europe, Oceania, Asia and the Americas. The tour ranked 16th in Pollstar's "2011 Top 25 Worldwide Tours", earning over $59.5 million. At the conclusion of 2011, the tour ranked 13th on Billboard's annual "Top 25 Tours", earning nearly $50 million with 98 shows. It won an award for Favorite Tour Headliner at the 38th People's Choice Awards. On November 24, 2011, Perry had tweeted that there will be a concert DVD released for the tour.

Singles 

"California Gurls" was the lead single from Teenage Dream, which features rapper Snoop Dogg. The single made its radio debut on May 7, 2010 and was digitally released four days later. The song had received generally positive reviews from music critics, with many critics highlighting it as an album favorite. The song also received worldwide success as well, peaking at number one on the US Billboard Hot 100, staying there for six consecutive weeks. It also peaked at number one in New Zealand, United Kingdom, Australia, Canada, Ireland, and Scotland. It was the best selling digital song of 2010.

"Teenage Dream" was released as the second single from the album. The song went to radio stations in the US on July 22, 2010. The song received positive reviews from music critics, with Jocelyn Vena of MTV said it "picks up right where 'California Gurls' leaves off", describing it as having "a strong beat". The song had also had chart success as similar to the first single, peaking at number one on the US Billboard Hot 100 for two consecutive weeks, and also peaked at number one in Ireland, New Zealand, Scotland, Slovakia and other sub-charts in the US.

"Firework" was released as the third offering from the album. The song was released on October 18, 2010 through radio airplay, followed by a digital release on November 2, 2010 in the UK. The music video for "Firework" is part of a cross-promotional deal with European telecommunications group Deutsche Telekom. Deutsche Telekom hosted a series of activities and competitions from which fans around Europe were recruited to be in the video. The song had commercial success as well, peaking at number one in the US and spent four non-consecutive weeks. The song also topped the charts in Brazil, Canada, New Zealand and subcharts in the US.

"E.T." was released on February 11, 2011. For its single release, the song was remixed to feature new verses from Kanye West. The music video for the song, directed by Floria Sigismondi, was filmed in February 2011 and features both Perry and West. The video was released on March 31, 2011. The song topped the charts in the US for five non-consecutive weeks, and also peaked at the top position in Canada, Germany, Poland and New Zealand.

"Last Friday Night (T.G.I.F.)" was released on June 6, 2011 on contemporary hit and rhythmic contemporary radios as the fifth single from the album. The song received generally mixed reviews from music critics. The song also received commercial success, peaking at number one in Canada, the Czech Republic, Slovakia and the US, topping the Billboard Hot 100 chart for two consecutive weeks. The music video was released worldwide on June 14, 2011. It guest stars Darren Criss, Rebecca Black, Kevin McHale, Kenny G, Hanson, Corey Feldman and Debbie Gibson. A remixed version of "Last Friday Night" was released on August 8, 2011, featuring American rapper Missy Elliott. On August 17, 2011, with "Last Friday Night (T.G.I.F.)", Perry made history as the second artist overall, and first female, to achieve five number one singles on the US Billboard Hot 100 chart from one album. The song also became Perry's fourth number one in Canada.

"The One That Got Away" was released as the sixth single from Teenage Dream. The song was released on October 11, 2011 on US Mainstream radio. The song received mostly positive reviews from most music critics, who complimented Perry's serious tone. A teaser of the music video was also released in early November, and the full music video premiered on November 11, 2011 on The Ellen DeGeneres Show. On November 24, the single entered the top five of the Billboard Hot 100, making Teenage Dream one of only seven albums in US history to have six or more top 10 singles. On December 14, it became one in two albums to yield six top four songs, when it soared to number four, it later peaked at number three.

Promotional singles 
"Not Like the Movies" and "Circle the Drain" were released as promotional singles as album previews in the United States.. They debuted at numbers 53 and 58 on the Hot 100, respectively. The solo, album version of "E.T" was also released as a promotional single on the same day of the album release, before later being given an official single release. A remix of "Peacock" was released on March 26, 2012 on iTunes as the fourth and final promotional single of the album.

Critical reception 

Teenage Dream received mixed reviews upon release from music critics. Giving the album 4 out of 5 stars, Stephen Thomas Erlewine of AllMusic wrote that "There's no question Perry is smart enough to know every rule in pop but she's not inspired enough to ignore them, almost seeming nervous to break away from the de rigueur lite club beats that easily transition from day to night or the chilly, stainless-steel ballads designed to lose none of their luster on repeat plays." He felt that it contained "accents to her old One of the Boys palette" and distinguished itself through vulgar lyrics. Mikael Wood of Spin gave a mixed review, noting that the album "won't disappoint parents looking for reasons to worry about their kids". Rob Sheffield from Rolling Stone described the album as "heavy on Eighties beats, light on melody, taking a long dip into the Daft Punk filter-disco house sound." Greg Kot of the Chicago Tribune gave a negative review to the album. He criticized the production, calling it "Frankenstein-like", as well as calling Perry's vocals "robotic" and lacking "any elegance or nuance". Matthew Cole of Slant Magazine called it "over-produced bad-girl debauchery", claiming that Perry has "found a way to lower the bar".

The Los Angeles Times gave it three stars, saying, "On "Teenage Dream," the songs alternate between weekend-bender celebrations of hedonism and self-help-style affirmations encouraging listeners to get an emotional makeover. Either way, acquisition is the goal: of a great love, a happy hangover, a perfect pair of Daisy Dukes". Leah Greenblatt, writing for Entertainment Weekly, stated, "beneath the fruity outfits and fart jokes, Perry is clearly serious about the business of hit songcraft; that doesn't make Dream nearly cohesive as an album, but it does provide, intermittently, exactly the kind of high-fructose rush she's aiming for." On the album's 10th anniversary, Patrick Gomez of The A.V. Club praised it as "pop perfection", writing that "the magic of the album is that it remains cohesive" and "the heightened emotions of teen love, lust, and self-discovery remain a constant throughout".

Year-end lists

Decade-end lists

Best-of lists
#4 – Rolling Stones 50 Best Songs of 2010 for "Teenage Dream".
#4 – Rolling Stone Brasils Top 25 international songs of the year for "California Gurls".
#25 – Rolling Stone Brasils Top 25 albums international of the year for Teenage Dream.
#71 The Faders 2017 list of "150 More Great Albums Made By Women"

Commercial performance 

After its release, Teenage Dream debuted at number one on the US Billboard 200 chart, with a total of 192,000 copies sold in its first week.  In the week July 21, 2012, the album jumped from 21 to two on the chart (up 417% on sales) with sales of 80,000 copies, becoming best sales frame since Christmas of 2010 after being discounted to 99 cents on Amazon. On the week ending March 14, 2015, the album completed 200 weeks in the chart since it debuted on September 11, 2010 making it the 25th album to spend more than 200 weeks or more on the Billboard 200. On the week ending November 5, 2022, the album completed 300 weeks in the chart, making it the sixth album to spend more weeks by female artist on the Billboard 200. Teenage Dream has been certified nine-times platinum by the Recording Industry Association of America (RIAA), and has sold 3,100,000 pure copies in United States as of August 2020. The album also debuted at number one on the Canadian Albums Chart, selling a total of 26,000 copies, and was later certified quadruple-Platinum by Music Canada.

In Australia, Teenage Dream debuted at number one for a two-week run at the top of the chart. The album was certified triple-Platinum by the Australian Recording Industry Association (ARIA), for shipments of 210,000 units. In New Zealand, Teenage Dream debuted at number two, and reached number one after four weeks on the chart. It was certified Gold by the Recording Industry Association of New Zealand (RIANZ). As of June 19, 2012, Teenage Dream is the 12th best-selling album of all-time in the country, resulting her as the fifth female to make it on the list (behind Adele, Norah Jones, Shania Twain, and Bic Runga). In the United Kingdom, Teenage Dream debuted at number one on the UK Albums Chart, selling more than 54,176 copies. It was certificated 4× Platinum by British Phonographic Industry for shipments of 1,200,000 units. As of February 2017, the album has sold 1.3 million copies in the UK.

In France, Teenage Dream debuted at number 14 on the French Albums Chart and peaked at number three. The album was certified Platinum by the Syndicat National de l'Édition Phonographique (SNEP). In Mexico, the album debuted and peaked at number 11. The album was certified Gold by (AMPROFON) Association. In Spain, Teenage Dream debuted at number four on the Spanish Albums Chart and stayed on the chart for 27 weeks. In Brazil, Teenage Dream peaked at number four on the Top Álbuns Brasil. As of July 2013, Teenage Dream has sold 6 million copies worldwide.

Accolades

Legacy 

Teenage Dream achieved a multitude of records throughout its run. Perry scored five Billboard Hot 100 number one singles from Teenage Dream, making her the second artist in the chart's 53-year history to amass five number-one singles from one album over its first release after Michael Jackson achieved the feat with his 1987 album Bad. Perry is the first female in history to achieve this milestone. The album is one of only three albums to produce six or more top-five singles on the Billboard Hot 100 chart (along with Janet Jackson's Rhythm Nation 1814 and George Michael's Faith), and the first album to have seven songs top the Dance Club Songs chart, breaking the previous record set by Beyoncé's I Am... Sasha Fierce and Kristine W's The Power of Music, both with six songs. Perry was able to replicate this success in the United Kingdom, breaking the Official Charts Company's record for the most Top 10 singles from one studio album by a female solo artist.

Eight songs from Teenage Dream have topped Billboards Adult Top 40 chart as well as the Mainstream Top 40 chart, both more than any other album in each respective chart's history. Additionally, with seven chart-toppers from "Waking Up in Vegas", Perry broke the record for the longest streak of number ones on the Mainstream Top 40 set by Lady Gaga's first six singles. The singles also allowed Perry to have an unprecedented 69-week long streak in the Hot 100's top-10, as well as a 71-week top-10 streak on the Airplay chart. Perry also has the most number-one singles (four) from one album to top the Canadian Hot 100.
Combined, the songs have sold a total of over 35 million copies worldwide aside from the album. Also, the first five singles from the album topped the charts in the United States and attained top-10 positions in more than 20 countries. All five singles also topped the Digital and Airplay charts, making her the first artist ever to have five number-one singles in the Airplay chart. Perry became the only artist to spend over 52 consecutive weeks in the top 10 of the Billboard Hot 100, and later heightened this to 69 weeks, with the first five singles from album, breaking the 15-year long previous record held by Ace of Base of 48 weeks with three singles . On the Mainstream Top 40 the album holds the unique record in the chart's history to have four songs from the same album in the top five of "Most weekly plays"; 1. "Last Friday Night (T.G.I.F.)" (12,468), 2. "E.T." (12,361), 3. "California Gurls" (12,159), and 4. "Firework" (11,857). 

In a retrospective review of the Teenage Dream, Pitchfork called the album "a crowning achievement, not just of her career but of its style: EDM and disco and pop, bold and belting, entirely processed yet instantly recognizable, robust yet chintzy." uDiscover Music wrote that the album "holds an outsized influence on pop music landscape and the many artists she helped inspire" and that it along with the "Teenage Dream" song "lives on as a nostalgic spectacle that set the course for the pop icon's aesthetic". VH1 called Teenage Dream "the most important pop album of the last 10 years" and added "it surged a blend of silliness into the dance genre that had been dominated by Lady Gaga's Fame Monster edge". In an interview for Apple Music for her album If I Can't Have Love, I Want Power, American singer-songwriter Halsey called Teenage Dream the "perfect pop album", saying: "Anyone who's trying to make a perfect pop album is wasting their time because Katy already did it with Teenage Dream."

Track listing 

Notes
  signifies a vocal producer
  signifies a remixer

Personnel 
Adapted from the Teenage Dream liner notes.

Ammo – drums, keyboards, programming, producer (track 8)
Benny Blanco – drums, keyboards, programming, producer (tracks 1, 3)
Dr. Luke – drums (1-3, 7-8),  keyboards (1-3, 7-8), programming (1-3, 7-8), producer (1-3, 7, 8),  executive producer
Mikkel S. Eriksen – recording engineer (4), producer (5), instrumentation (4-5)
Nicolas Essig – assistant engineer
Fabien Waltmann – synthesizer, music programming (track 10)
Josh Freese – drums (tracks 6, 11)
Charles Malone – guitar (track 6), assistant engineer
Max Martin – drums (1-3, 7-8), keyboards (1-3, 7-8), programming (1-3, 7-8), producer (1-3, 7-8),  executive producer
Julio Miranda – guitar (track 6)
Monte Neuble – keyboards (tracks 9, 11)
Tucker Bodine – assistant engineer
Randy Urbanski – engineer
Luis Navarro – assistant engineer
Nick Chahwala – other sounds, guitar (track 6)
Chris "Tek" O'Ryan – recording engineer (tracks 6, 9, 11),  guitar engineer
Brent Paschke – guitar (tracks 9, 11)
L. Leon Pendarvis – arranger (track 7), conductor
Katy Perry – vocals (All tracks), piano, guitar, songwriter, producer, executive producer
Lenny Pickett – saxophone (track 2)
Daniel Silvestri – bass guitar, guitar (track 6)
Snoop Dogg – vocals (track 3)
Stargate  – producer
Tricky Stewart – keyboards (9, 11), producer, drum programming (6, 9, 11)
Greg Wells – synthesizer (track 10), piano (10, 12), drums (10, 12), programming (10, 12), producer (10, 12)
Will Cotton – photography

Charts

Weekly charts

Year-end charts

Decade-end charts

Certifications and sales

Release history

References

Notes 
Grein, Paul (March 16, 2011). "Week Ending March 13, 2011: Spears' Second Act". Chart Watch. Yahoo! Music. Retrieved March 16, 2011.

2010 albums
Albums produced by Benny Blanco
Albums produced by Dr. Luke
Albums produced by Greg Wells
Albums produced by Jon Brion
Albums produced by Max Martin
Albums produced by Stargate
Albums produced by Tricky Stewart
Capitol Records albums
Katy Perry albums
Albums produced by Kuk Harrell
Juno Award for International Album of the Year albums
Pop albums by American artists